Up-N-Away was the name of a vertical-sliding bath/shower door manufactured by Unitspan Architectural Systems, Inc. The bathtub shower doors had vertical tracks instead of horizontal, and closed downward or opened upwards rather than sideways. The channel tracks were vertical on each side with only a low profile sill necessary across the front rim of the tub enclosure to direct water back into tub when in use with door closed; this enabled the entire front edge/rim of tub enclosure to be relatively flat when the doors were open. This design was also to make the front edge/rim of tub to always be clean as well as comfortable to sit on when bathing a child. The vertical-sliding doors were counterbalanced to be kept up and out of the way for an elegant look, but slid to lower positions for showering. Within the vertical track channels, the lower left and right edge of each sliding door attached to counterweighted ropes with nylon hanger brackets. The downward-closing bath shower doors aimed to solve the disadvantages of conventional, sideways-sliding doors to provide more convenience, relaxation and luxury. They were at first marketed on a store- or factory-to-consumer basis, with do-it-yourself installation required.

References 

Bathing